The Wellington Tramway Museum is located at Queen Elizabeth Park on the lower North Island of New Zealand, near the overbridge at McKay's Crossing between Paekakariki and Paraparaumu. Trams have been in operation on a line through the park since 1965. The Trams owned by the museum date back to the 1920s and 1930s and were used on the Wellington tramway system between 1878 and 1964, transporting commuters around the city.

History
The museum also owns an ex-Brisbane tram No.236 which is leased to the Tramway Historical Society of Christchurch, the body and chassis of a New Plymouth Birney tram which is on long-term loan to the Whanganui Tramways Trust, plus a small collection of diesel buses and trolley buses from Wellington and New Plymouth.  The Museum previously owned ex-Brisbane "Dreadnought" tram No.133 (gifted to the Whanganui Tramways Trust in 2017) and the body and chassis only of ex-Wanganui tram No.8, also gifted to the Whanganui Tramways Trust.

From 1969 to 1974, Saul Goldsmith was president of the Tramway Museum.

Opening hours
The museum is open every Saturday and Sunday from 11am to 4.30pm (last tram 4pm), and on public holidays except for Christmas Day. After Christmas the museum opens daily from Boxing Day (26 December) to Wellington Anniversary Day in late January. The museum also opens with restricted hours throughout some school holidays, these dates being advertised on the Museum's website.
During open hours tram rides are available in a heritage Wellington electric tram (nearly 4 kilometres return) and visitors are able to inspect the museum exhibits.

Wellington trams

Camp Russell and Camp Mackay
The museum is on a part of the site of the US Marines' camps there between 1942 and 1944. A ceremony was held on Memorial Day 2012 among the trams very familiar to Marines visiting Wellington.

References

External links

 Wellington Tramway Museum official website

Rail transport in Wellington
Railway museums in New Zealand
Heritage streetcar systems
Kapiti Coast District
Museums in the Wellington Region